Iliyas Daudi (born 1967) is a former Soviet and Russian military serviceman, Hero of Russian Federation.
 Zamir Daudi (born 1987) is an Afghan footballer.
 Hiyya al-Daudi (born 1154) was a prominent rabbi, composer, and poet of Andalusia.

See also
 Daudi Cwa II of Buganda was Kabaka of the Kingdom of Buganda from 1897 until 1939.